Mudhawi Al-Shammari (born 25 April 1998) is a Kuwaiti athlete.

The holder of Kuwaiti national records both indoor and outdoor in 100 metres and 200 metres, she competed at the Athletics at the 2020 Summer Olympics – Women's 100 metres, she qualified from the preliminary heats into the first round with a run of 11.82 seconds.

See also
List of Kuwaiti records in athletics

References

External links
 

1998 births
Living people
Kuwaiti female sprinters
Olympic athletes of Kuwait
Athletes (track and field) at the 2020 Summer Olympics
Olympic female sprinters